The Essex Pirates were a British Basketball League team from Southend-on-Sea, in the county of Essex. They were founded in 2009 and played their home games at the Southend Leisure & Tennis Centre. Following the loss of a major sponsor, the franchise withdrew from the league just two weeks prior to the start of the 2011-12 season and have remained inactive since, with much of their former fan-base now following Essex Leopards.

History

Basketball in Essex
Prior to the creation of the Pirates franchise in 2009, the county of Essex had previous flirtations with top-level basketball through the Essex Leopards franchise, still a synonymous name with the area. After mounting costs forced the Greater London Leopards to look away from their traditional London Arena home, the franchise moved out of London and settled for a new nest in Brentwood in 1998. The venture lasted for five seasons before the club folded, to be replaced with the supporter-backed Essex & Herts Leopards in 2004. Though many fans consider it to be a direct continuation of the Leopards name, the new club was, in fact, a separate entity, formed from the rubble of the Ware Rebels. The club have risen to prominence in the lower leagues of the English Basketball League, and are currently found alternating between venues in Brentwood and Basildon Sporting Village.

The foundations of the new franchise were already in place through the Essex Basketball Club’s Advanced Apprentice-ship in Sporting Excellence (AASE) basketball training programme which was present at the South East Essex College, and the ambitious plans spearheaded by the programmes’ operator Great Britain Under 20's coach Tim Lewis.

Pirates set sail
The application to the British Basketball League, the country’s top league, was formally accepted on 11 June 2009, as well as plans to operate several initiatives alongside the BBL team and the existing AASE programme, included an England Basketball Division Four development team and a non-profit community coaching company to deliver coaching into primary schools across the county. The following months saw plenty of action and preparation in time for the inaugural season, and the club announced their first signings in August, with the inclusion of Spaniard starlet Pablo Rodrigo, British international Kyle Dodds and BBL veteran Dean Williams, formerly of Guildford, London Towers and Thames Valley Tigers becoming the first names on the roster. The eventual team sheet would be one centred on young, homegrown players, with the roster being predominantly British ranging from the ages of 20 to 26.

The new team took to their home court at Southend Leisure & Tennis Centre for the first time on 3 October, in a home league encounter with London Capital, eventually going on to win a tight affair 61-60, despite being up 49-37 at the end of the 3rd quarter. Pirates 6ft11 forward Alan Metclalfe led the games’ scoring with 21 points, while Pablo Rodrigo and Colin Sing both fouled out within the last 2 minutes. Pirates secured their first away win a few weeks later on 15 October, with an 82-88 victory against the Worthing Thunder, Taner Adu of the Pirates posted 29 points for the visitors. On 27 November, the club announced the signing of former Plymouth Raiders guard, Haggai Hundert.

Home arenas

Southend Leisure & Tennis Centre (2009-2011)

Season-by-season records

Notable former players
 Josh Clark
 Myles Hesson
  Haggai Hundert
 Marcus Knight
 Walid Mumuni
 Pablo Rodrigo
 Dean Williams
 David Celestini

References

External links
Essex Pirates photos from Pixel8 Photos
Essex Pirates on Facebook
Essex Pirates on Twitter

Defunct basketball teams in the United Kingdom
Basketball teams established in 2009
Basketball teams in England
Sports clubs in Southend-on-Sea
Basketball teams disestablished in 2011
2009 establishments in England
2011 disestablishments in England
Former British Basketball League teams